Red Kill may refer to:

Red Kill (Bush Kill tributary), New York State
Red Kill (Schoharie Creek tributary), New York State; see Schoharie Creek

See also
Little Red Kill, a stream in New York State